The Gate of Carmen (Spanish: Puerta del Carmen) is a gate located in Zaragoza, Spain. It was declared Bien de Interés Cultural in 1908.

References

See also 

 List of Bien de Interés Cultural in the Province of Zaragoza

City gates in Spain
Buildings and structures in Zaragoza
Bien de Interés Cultural landmarks in the Province of Zaragoza